Michael Cashmore is an English composer and musician currently living in Berlin. He has created music under the name of Nature and Organisation since the early 1980s and more recently (2006) under his own name.

Cashmore was a member of the group Current 93 from the late 1980s until around 2006. He composed the majority of the music for the group during that period. He has collaborated with many artists including David Tibet, Antony and the Johnsons, Bill Fay, Marc Almond, Nick Cave, Rose McDowall, Douglas P and Steven Stapleton.

After moving to Berlin in 2004 Cashmore broke several years of silence by releasing his first solo CD Sleep England in May 2006.

Early 2007 saw the release of The Snow Abides, a mini album containing a collection of songs that feature vocals by Antony Hegarty of Antony and the Johnsons.
 
In April 2008 Cashmore released a two-track EP with Marc Almond titled Gabriel and the Lunatic Lover which sets two poems "Gabriel" and "The Lunatic Lover" by Count Stenbock to music. Marc Almond appeared as a guest of Current 93 at the Queen Elizabeth Hall in London on 21 June 2008 and performed these songs with Cashmore on guitar. These two songs later appeared on a collaborative album by Marc Almond and Michael Cashmore in 2011 called Feasting With Panthers.

In 2017, Cashmore reissued published and unpublished works by the group Nature And Organisation on a double CD, and a series of four vinyl records, with the German label Trisol Music Group GmbH. In the same year, Cashmore released an electronic / experimental white vinyl EP under his own name with artist Shaltmira, to celebrate the 20th anniversary of the founding of the label.

Cashmore has publicly stated via social media that he is transforming himself, and his music is a reflection of this transformation. He released two albums on the Austrian label Klanggalerie, The Doctrine Of Transformation Through Love Parts I and II in 2019 and 2020, which are heavily electronic and experimental but also feature two songs recorded with Bill Fay and Little Annie.

Cashmore has also now formed a movement connected to his music called The Hidden Throne which he uses to share and promote his ideas of personal transformation.

In 2021 Cashmore announced the release of his new album "The Night Has Rushed In" on the English record label House of Mythology. The title track of the album features a text written by David Tibet of Current 93 and sang by Anohni.

References

English composers
English rock singers
English pop singers
Living people
Year of birth missing (living people)
Place of birth missing (living people)
Current 93 members